Bill Oddie's How to Watch Wildlife is a British BBC TV programme about natural history that aired on BBC Two presented by Bill Oddie and produced by Stephen Moss. A first series of eight episodes were broadcast from 7 January to 4 March 2005, and a second and final series of eight episodes from 17 January to 7 March 2006.

External links
 

2005 British television series debuts
2006 British television series endings
2000s British documentary television series
BBC television documentaries
Natural history of the United Kingdom
English-language television shows